Anime Weekend Atlanta (AWA) is an annual four-day anime convention held during September/October at the Renaissance Waverly Hotel, Cobb Galleria Centre, and Sheraton Suites Galleria in Atlanta, Georgia. The convention is the largest Southeastern anime convention.

Programming
The convention typically offers an Anime Music Video contest, Artists' Alley, concerts, costume contest, dances, Dealer's Room, fashion show, formal ball, game shows, karaoke, Maid Cafe, panels, RPG Gaming, tabletop gaming, Video Gaming, and Workshops. Anime Weekend Atlanta during the convention has 24-hour programming.

History
The Anime Music Video contest in 2001 had 200 plus entries. The AMV contest in 2003 took over three hours and had 300 plus entries. The Dealer's Room took up 72,000 square feet in 2007. Cartoon Network announced the end of its Toonami block during a panel at Anime Weekend Atlanta 2008. Loverin Tamburin could not enter the United States for their 2015 appearance due to visa issues. Anime Weekend Atlanta 2020 was cancelled due to the COVID-19 pandemic. An online event was later held from December 18-20, 2020. Anime Weekend Atlanta in 2021 had both a mask mandate and vaccination/testing policy. The convention also occurred during the 2021 World Series, causing local traffic concerns.

Event history

References

 Lillard, Kevin. "Anime Weekend Atlanta". (November 2006) Newtype USA. p. 97.

External links

 Anime Weekend Atlanta Website

Anime conventions in the United States
1995 establishments in Georgia (U.S. state)
Annual events in Georgia (U.S. state)
Tourist attractions in Cobb County, Georgia
Festivals in Atlanta
Tourist attractions in Atlanta
Festivals established in 1995
Conventions in Atlanta